Bogdan Zakharovich Kobulov (1 March 1904 – 23 December 1953) served as a senior member of the Soviet security- and police-apparatus during the rule of Joseph Stalin. After Stalin's death he was executed along with his former chief and patron Lavrentiy Beria.

Early Career 
Bogdan Kobulov was an Armenian, born in Tbilisi, the son of a tailor. He did odd jobs before being drafted into the Red Army in 1921. He joined Cheka in 1922, and held minor posts, until he was spotted by Beria in 1931 and recruited to the Secret Political department of the OGPU in Georgia. In April 1937, during the Great Purge, he was appointed deputy chairman of the Georgian NKVD and head of the Secret-Political Department. This meant that he was in charge of eliminating officers associated with the ex-head of the NKVD, Genrikh Yagoda. Death sentences in Georgia were imposed by a troika (trio) chaired either by Kobulov, or the head of the Georgian NKVD, Sergo Goglidze. Under Kobulov's chairmanship, 1,233 people were sentenced to death.

Role in the Great Purge 
In December 1938, after Beria took control of the NKVD, he transferred Kobulov to Moscow, as head of the newly created Investigative Directorate of the NKVD. From 1939, Kobulov was a candidate member of the Central Committee of the Communist Party. From April 1939, he was Head of the Main Economic Department of the NKVD/MGB.

Kobulov, who was in charge of major investigations, was a notorious torturer, who has been described as "the worst man God put on the face of the Earth" and "a burly oversized Caucasian with muddy brown bullish eyes ... hairy hands (and) short bow legs" who "beat his victims with his fists, jumped on them and leaned on his huge weight. His favourite instrument of torture was a baton." When Kobulov was under investigation, in the 1950s, he admitted that several times, in Beria's office, he hit a prisoner named Ivan Belakhov, a scientist arrested in June 1939. Belakhov, who was shot in 1941, left behind a written account of his treatment:

The aim was to force Belakhov to 'confess' that he had had an affair with Polina Zhemchuzhina, wife of the prime minister, Vyacheslav Molotov, which he said was impossible because he was impotent.

The Georgian philosopher Shalva Nutsubidze and Yevgeny Gnedin, diplomat son of the revolutionary Alexander Parvus, who were both arrested in the 1930s but survived, left descriptions of being tortured by Kobulov. Nutsubidze had his nails torn out, 

He was also in charge of the case against Beria's predecessor, Nikolai Yezhov. In May 1940, he signed the warrant for the arrest of the writer Isaac Babel.

War time 
After the Soviet army had occupied eastern Poland, under the terms of the pact with Nazi Germany, Kobulov helped supervise the massacre of nearly 22,000 Polish prisoners of war in the Katyn Forest and in prisons, for which he was awarded the Order of Suvorov. In February 1944, he travelled to Grozny, capital of the Chechen republic, to assist in the mass deportation of around 650,000 Chechen and Ingush men, women and children. In May 1944, he helped supervise the deportation of neraly 200,000 Tatars and other ethnic minorities from the Crimea and Black Sea coast, for which he was awarded the Order of the Red Banner.

Downfall 
Kobulov was abruptly sacked on 30 November 1945, in what may have been a move by Stalin to reduce Beria's influence. The next day, Kobulov wrote a plaintive letter to Stalin, pleading that he had done 17 years loyal service and promising more in whatever job he was given next. After several months unemployed, he was appointed deputy head of the Main Directorate of Soviet Property Abroad in 1946. In March 1951, he was appointed Deputy Chief of the Soviet administration in Germany.

After Stalin died, in March 1953, and Beria recaptured control of the MGB (forerunner of the KGB), which was merged with the Ministry of internal Affairs (MVD), Kobulov was recalled to Moscow as First Deputy Minister. He was arrested on the same day as Beria, 27 June 1953. According to the official announcement in Pravda, he was tried with Beria and five others on 18-23 December, 1953, and pleaded guilty to "a number of most serious crimes for the purposes of exterminating honourable cadres" and of plotting to "liquidate the Soviet worker-peasant system". He was sentenced to death and executed on 23 December 1953.

Family 
Bogdan Kobulov's younger brother Amayak Kobulov was also a Chekist, executed in the 1950s for his links to Beria. He also had a daughter, Lelia, was "famous for her dresses and fur coats."

References

External links
  Кто руководил НКВД, 1934—1941

1904 births
1953 deaths
Politicians from Tbilisi
People from Tiflis Governorate
Central Committee of the Communist Party of the Soviet Union candidate members
Commissars 2nd Class of State Security
Communist Party of the Soviet Union members
Second convocation members of the Supreme Soviet of the Soviet Union
Recipients of the Order of Kutuzov, 1st class
Recipients of the Order of Lenin
Recipients of the Order of the Red Banner
Recipients of the Order of the Red Banner of Labour
Recipients of the Order of Suvorov, 1st class
Armenian people executed by the Soviet Union
People from Georgia (country) executed by the Soviet Union
Members of the Communist Party of the Soviet Union executed by the Soviet Union
Georgian people of Armenian descent
Cheka officers
Soviet Armenians
Soviet diplomats